Denis Gennadievich Kirilenko (born 6 November 1984) is a former Russian professional football player.

Playing career
He made his debut in the Russian Premier League in 2007 for FC Kuban Krasnodar.

He was banned for a year from playing football in 2011 for betting on games.

References

1984 births
People from Kanevskoy District
Living people
Russian footballers
FC Kuban Krasnodar players
FC Rostov players
Russian Premier League players
FC Fakel Voronezh players
FC Vityaz Podolsk players
FC Volgar Astrakhan players
Association football midfielders
FC Nizhny Novgorod (2015) players
FC Baikal Irkutsk players
Sportspeople from Krasnodar Krai